Roy N. Vance (November 14, 1921 – January 17, 2007) was a justice of the Kentucky Supreme Court from 1983 to 1991.

Vance was born in McCracken County, Kentucky. He graduated from the University of Kentucky law school and joined the army. Due to a special statute, he was the only person admitted to the state bar before the age of 21. Vance served as McCracken County attorney from 1953 to 1957. He was commissioner for the old Court of Appeals from 1970 to 1976, when he became a judge on the court when it was created in a constitutional amendment. He served in this capacity until joining the state supreme court in 1983.

Vance died on January 17, 2007, in Vero Beach, Florida. He is survived by his wife Euleen; two daughters, Linda and Terry; and a son, Newton.

References

1921 births
2007 deaths
Justices of the Kentucky Supreme Court
People from McCracken County, Kentucky
University of Kentucky College of Law alumni
20th-century American judges